Kuh Mareh Khami Rural District is a rural district (dehestan) in the Central District of Basht County, Kohgiluyeh and Boyer-Ahmad Province, Iran. At the 2006 census, its population was 4,295, in 924 families. The rural district has 64 villages.

References 

Rural Districts of Kohgiluyeh and Boyer-Ahmad Province
Basht County